The land that is now the State of Maryland in the United States of America was widely populated by indigenous tribes prior to European arrival, however only 1.0% of the state's population self-reported as Native American in the 2010 United States Census. Native Americans have inhabited the area since .

History

Prehistory
Paleo-Indians inhabited Maryland beginning in  10,000 B.C. as the Pleistocene ice sheet retreated, having come from other areas of North America to hunt. 

Members of the Monongahela culture lived in the western portion of Maryland, constructing sites such as the Barton Village Site and Meyer Site. Evidence found at the Barton Village Site suggests that the area was occupied from  A.D. 1000–1500.

17th century

Captain John Smith explored and mapped the Chesapeake Bay and its surrounding area from 1607 to 1609, interacting with a number of Native American groups along the way. On his 1607 voyage, Smith was captured near the Chickahominy River in Virginia and taken to Powhatan. While in captivity, he learned and recorded a significant amount about the lifestyle, language, and politics of the local Native Americans.

The first European settlers in Maryland founded the settlement of St. Mary's City after arriving at St. Clement's Island in 1634. This land was purchased by Leonard Calvert from the Yaocomico people, who inhabited the site prior to colonial arrival. This was a largely peaceful interaction, with the two groups sharing the settlement until the Yaocomico left at the end of the growing season.

In 1659, Colonel Edmund Scarborough led a series of unprovoked raids against the previously peaceful Assateague people. Referred to as the "Seaside War of 1659," this series of raids increased natives' hostility towards European settlers.

Several treaties were signed between Maryland Colony and various local Native American tribes after 1650, including the Assateagues, Nanticokes, and Susquehannocks. Various Native American reservations were also established during this period, including Askiminokonson.

18th century
Treaties between settlers and Native Americans continued in the 18th century, with roughly 3,000 acres being set aside by the colony as Native American reservations.

In June 1744, the leaders of the Six Nations gave up all of their claims within the colony.

The Nanticoke tribe relinquished their land in June 1768, with the General Assembly's records stating that "they are desirous of totally leaving this Province and going to live
with their Brethren who have incorporated themselves with the Six Nations."

19th century
The Nanticoke Tribe was recognized by Maryland in 1881 as a legal entity.

20th century
The Baltimore American Indian Center was founded in 1968 to assist Native American residents in the area.

21st century
More than 40,000 people in Maryland self-identified as being at least part American Indian in the 2010 U.S. Census.

Tribes
Prior to European arrival and the subsequent removal of indigenous people from the area, Native Americans occupied most of modern-day Maryland. The three main groups in the area were the Algonquian, Iroquois, and Siouan peoples. Native American territorial boundaries were extremely fluid during this period, with tribes often sharing territory and moving regularly.

Algonquian
There was a large Algonquian population within Maryland prior to European arrival. These Algonquian tribes were coastal, often living off the waters of the Chesapeake Bay and Atlantic Ocean. Most Algonquians left the area by the 1700s.

Choptank
The Choptank tribe lived in modern-day Talbot, Dorchester, and Caroline counties, including the town of Cambridge. They were the only tribe granted a reservation by the Maryland colony, which they lived on until the land was sold to developers by the government in 1822.

Lenape
The Lenape, or Delaware, tribe had a number of residents within modern-day Cecil County. Like many other Lenape, most of these residents were forced to Oklahoma by the 1850s.

Matapeake
The Matapeake tribe lived on Kent Island and had contact with William Claiborne in 1631. Due to European encroachment on the island in the 17th and 18th centuries, many Matapeake left and assimilated into other Algonquian tribes.

Nanticoke
The Nanticoke people inhabited much of the Delmarva Peninsula, including modern-day Salisbury and Princess Anne. A member of the Powhatan Confederacy, the Nanticoke were named "Kuskarawaok" by John Smith in 1608. Most Nanticoke left Maryland by the 1750s, with others assimilating into European society in the area.

Iroquois
The Iroquois as a people were generally located in areas more northern than Maryland, but three tribes had a significant presence in the area.

Massawomeck
The Massawomeck's presence in Maryland was mostly within modern-day Allegany County and Garrett County. The tribe conducted raids against the western Maryland Algonquians and traded heavily with other tribes and Europeans. The tribe's fate is largely unknown, disappearing from historical record in 1635.

Susquehannock
The Susquehannock tribe was present in modern-day Allegany, Cecil, and Harford counties. After warring with Maryland colony from 1642 to 1652, the tribe signed a peace agreement that gave much of the land south of the mouth of the Susquehanna River to Maryland. This effectively ended the tribe's presence in Maryland.

Tuscarora
The Tuscarora tribe emigrated to Maryland after losing the Tuscarora War, in which they lost much of their land to North Carolinian settlers. Their presence was short-lived, with the tribe passing though Frederick County from 1719 to 1721. The tribe ultimately settled in the Great Lakes Region and became a member of the Iroquois Six Nation Confederation.

Siouan
John Smith did not encounter any Siouan Native Americans during his 1608 exploration. However, the Monacan, Saponi, and Tutelo tribes emigrated through Maryland during the mid-1700s. Some small bands of the Saponi and Tutelo tribes were found in the area following this emigration. The Saponi band settled in Dorchester County, with both groups likely later assimilating into the local Nanticoke tribe.

Legal recognition

State recognition
Three tribes are formally recognized by the State of Maryland:
 Accohannock Indian Tribe
 Piscataway Conoy Tribe (Includes the Piscataway Conoy Confederacy and Sub-Tribes as well as the Cedarville Band of Piscataway Indians)
 Piscataway Indian Nation
The Maryland Commission on Indian Affairs serves eight groups of Native Americans:
 Accohannock Indian Tribe
 Assateague Peoples Tribe
 Cedarville Band of Piscataway Indians (Sub-group of the Piscataway Conoy Tribe)
 Nause-Waiwash Band of Indians
 Piscataway Conoy Confederacy and Sub-Tribes (Sub-group of the Piscataway Conoy Tribe)
 Piscataway Indian Nation
 Pocomoke Indian Nation
 Youghiogheny River Band of Shawnee Indian

Federal recognition
There are no federally recognized tribes within Maryland. However, Section 106 of the National Historic Preservation Act of 1966 requires the State of Maryland to consult with federally recognized Native nations on all projects that could affect historic tribal lands or other properties with cultural or religious significance to Native nations.

References

External links
 Maryland Commission on Indian Affairs